Panasonic Lumix DMC-GF2 is the sixth camera in Panasonic's Lumix G-series, using the Micro Four Thirds System.

The main GF2 innovation is the inclusion of a touch sensitive rear LCD screen which can be used to control mode, focus and operation of the camera. The Panasonic DMC-GF2 uses the touch screen to provide mode selection, as such that there isn't a mode dial on the camera. Features including zoom and focus are controlled via the 3-inch touchscreen at the rear of the unit or by manual zoom and focus on the lens.

The GF-2 was offered in four variations, GF2 (body only); GF2C (body + 14 mm f/2.5 wide angle lens); GF2K (body + 14-42mm f/3.5-5.6 zoom lens; and GF2W (body + both 14mm and 14–42 mm lenses).  Available colors were black (suffix K); silver (suffix S); white (suffix W); red (suffix R) and pink (suffix P).

Features

Firmware updates

Panasonic Releases 
Panasonic has announced the following firmware update

See also
 Olympus PEN E-P2
 Olympus PEN E-PL2
 Olympus PEN E-P3
 Olympus PEN E-PL3
 Panasonic Lumix DMC-GF1
 Panasonic Lumix DMC-GF3

Micro Four Thirds Camera introduction roadmap

References

External links

Panasonic Lumix DMC-GF2 Product site
Panasonic Lumix DMC-GF2 Press Release
Panasonic Lumix DMC-GF2 Photos
Panasonic Lumix DMC-GF2 Review - dpreview.com
Panasonic DMC-GF2 Review - cameralabs.com
Panasonic Lumix DMC-GF2 - imaging-resource.com

GF2